George Patterson  was a 19th-century Major League Baseball player. He played outfield in two games for the  Philadelphia Keystones of the Union Association in 1884. He had one hit in seven at-bats in those two games.

Sources

19th-century baseball players
Major League Baseball outfielders
Philadelphia Keystones players
Date of birth missing
Date of death missing